Durusu Terminal is a gas metering station in Turkey, located in Çarşamba district, nearly  from the city of Samsun. The terminal is virtually on the sea side, in the immediate vicinity of surfacing of the Blue Stream sub-sea natural gas pipeline. It is an integral component of the Russian-Turkish Blue Stream project

History
The foundation of the gas metering terminal was laid on 24 October 2000. The station was constructed by OHS Consortium, a joint venture between two Turkish companies Öztaş and Hazinedaroğlu and Russia's Stroytransgaz. The engineering and procurement was done by the Italian company Nuovo Pignone.

On 20 October 2002, the "golden welding" of the terminal to the pipeline was completed and starting on 30 December 2002, flow of natural gas from Russia to Turkey through Blue Stream was commenced.

Purpose and operation
The main purpose of the station is to lower and measure the pressure of incoming gas. Rated capacity of the station is 2 million cubic meters per hour. Control and management of the station is automated. Metering of transported gas is done by representatives of BOTAŞ on the Turkish side and Gazprom Export on the Russian side.

References

External links

The Blue Stream gas pipeline, Website of the Ministry of Foreign Affairs of Russian Federation
Nuovo Pignone, GE Oil and Gas website

Natural gas terminals
Energy infrastructure in Turkey
Natural gas in Turkey
Buildings and structures in Samsun Province
Ports and harbours of Turkey
Ports and harbours of the Black Sea
2002 establishments in Turkey